Walter Spring the Unfortunate (1620 – c.1678) was an Anglo-Irish Roman Catholic landowner involved in the Irish Confederate Wars.

Biography
Spring was the son of Thomas Spring, a lawyer. He was the grandson of Walter Spring, who had served as High Sheriff of Kerry, and the great-grandson of Captain Thomas Spring, Constable of Castlemaine. He inherited the family estates in County Kerry from his father, including Killagha Abbey, where he was born and brought up.

Unlike the previous generations of his family, Walter Spring was raised as a Catholic. His control of the strategic fortress at Castlemaine and the lands surrounding Milltown made him an important figure in Kerry. He attended the 1642 Kilkenny meeting of Catholic gentry which established the Association of the Confederate Catholics of Ireland and was active in helping to organise the war effort on behalf of the Catholic rebels. During the Cromwellian conquest of Ireland, Spring’s fortified manor house at Killagha Abbey was attacked by soldiers of the New Model Army armed with canon, leading to its destruction. Cromwell seized Spring’s extensive estates and granted Killagha to one of his supporters, Major John Godfrey.

Following the defeat of the Confederacy, Spring retained only a small portion of his estate. In order to protect it, he occasionally attended Protestant services. However, he was thought to still pose a significant threat by The Protectorate government and was transplanted to County Clare, where he had little influence, under the Act for the Settlement of Ireland 1652. This led to him being dubbed ‘The Unfortunate’ by both opponents and supporters. His remaining estates in Kerry were transferred to his son, Thomas.

AncestryThe Spring family of Suffolk and County Kerry, and branches in Australia, New Zealand and the USA, William Anthony Spring and Jane Vivien Spring, 2nd ednNotes for the Article: "Ancient history of the Kingdom of Kerry, by Friar O'Sullivan, of Muckross Abbey. With a pedigree of the family of O'Sullivan", Rev. Jarlath Prendergast, Journal of the Cork Historical and Archaeological Society , Ser. 2, Vols. IV-VI, 1898-1900, 27. 30., https://clanmaccarthysociety.org/Articles/KerryHistoryNotes.htmlNotes on the Family of Patrick Crosbie of Maryborough, by Whom the Seven Septs of Leix Were Transplanted to Tarbert in the County Kerry in 1608-9, Walter FitzGerald, The Journal of the Royal Society of Antiquaries of Ireland
Sixth Series, Vol. 13, No. 2 (Dec. 31, 1923), pp. 133-150, https://www.jstor.org/stable/25513295?loggedin=true&seq=1#page_scan_tab_contents

References

1620 births
Year of death uncertain
17th-century Anglo-Irish people
Irish Roman Catholic Confederates
People of the Irish Confederate Wars
Irish people of Norman descent
Walter